James Bond: Live And Let Die is a video game loosely based on the 1973 James Bond film Live and Let Die. The game was released by Domark for the Amiga, Atari ST, Amstrad CPC, Commodore 64, MS-DOS, and ZX Spectrum in 1988.

Live and Let Die is a racing game in which the player navigates James Bond driving a modified speedboat. It did not start as a Bond game, being a rebranding after Domark saw Elite Systems working on a game named Aquablast, and  thought the boat driving and fighting of said title resembled the speedboat chase of Live and Let Die.

References

External links

MI6 :: James Bond 007 Video Games - Live and Let Die
Movie Game Database - Live and Let Die

1988 video games
Amiga games
Amstrad CPC games
Atari ST games
Commodore 64 games
Domark games
James Bond video games
Video games scored by Mark Cooksey
ZX Spectrum games
Video games developed in the United Kingdom